Franklin Falls Pond is a ,  long pond created by damming the Saranac River three miles (5 km) northeast of Lower Saranac Lake in the Adirondack Mountains of northern New York State. The pond is also part of the 740-mile Northern Forest Canoe Trail, which begins in Old Forge, NY and ends in Fort Kent, ME.

History
The falls at the downstream (northern) end of the pond were the site of a sawmill, a hotel, and a hamlet that grew up around the mill; all were completely destroyed by a fire in 1852.  The hotel and the sawmill were rebuilt.  Paul Smith, proprietor of Paul Smith's Hotel bought the area around the falls and built a hydroelectric plant, the construction of which flooded , killing a substantial number of trees.  The state filed an injunction against the construction, which Smith ignored, leading the Association for the Protection of the Adirondacks to bring a suit that was finally settled in 1912, in Smith's favor.
Today all that remains of the hamlet is a more modern hydroelectric dam that holds back the pond.

Sources
Jamieson, Paul and Morris, Donald, Adirondack Canoe Waters, North Flow, Lake George, NY: Adirondack Mountain Club, 1987.  .

External links
 Adirondack Sports and Fitness - Franklin & Union Falls Ponds
 

Adirondack Park
Reservoirs in New York (state)
Protected areas of Essex County, New York
Protected areas of Franklin County, New York
Reservoirs in Essex County, New York
Reservoirs in Franklin County, New York
Northern Forest Canoe Trail